Gheorghe Caranfil was a Romanian fencer. He competed in the individual and team foil and épée events at the 1928 Summer Olympics.

References

External links
 

1893 births
Year of death missing
Romanian male épée fencers
Romanian male foil fencers
Olympic fencers of Romania
Fencers at the 1928 Summer Olympics